Sundarnath is a temple of Lord Shiva located in Kursakanta Araria of the Indian state of Bihar near the border of Nepal, at Sundari Math (Sundarnath Dham). People from South Nepal and North Bihar worship the Hindu god Shiva.

Religion 
Their religious tradition continued from Pandava's last year in exile for Agyatvas (Virata Parva). Legend says that Pandava worshipped Shiva (Baba Sundernath) for their life and safety. They hide their astra, shshtra under a tree before leaving for Virata.

Purnima festival 
Every Purnima thousands of devotee visit this place, offering worship to Lord Shiva (Baba Sundernath). Makkar Mela starts from the first Sunday of Makar Sankranti every year until the next fourth or fifth Sunday of the month. Maldhari' is important for business and cultural exchange. It starts from Maha Shivaratri and it continues for 15 to 20 days. Thousands of devotees from India and Nepal too visit this place. The development work is in progress to make temple grandeur and attractive.

Hindu temples in Bihar
Shiva_temples_in_Bihar